Wang Rui  is a Chinese ice dancer. With partner Zhang Wei, she is the 1999 Asian Winter Games champion. They placed 10th at the 2000 Four Continents Figure Skating Championships.

Following her retirement from competitive skating, she works for the Chinese Athletes Educational Foundation as an English language teacher.

Results
(with Zhang)

References

Chinese female ice dancers
Living people
Asian Games medalists in figure skating
Figure skaters at the 1999 Asian Winter Games
Asian Games gold medalists for China
Medalists at the 1999 Asian Winter Games
Year of birth missing (living people)
Competitors at the 2001 Winter Universiade